Cellular V2X (C-V2X) is a 3GPP standard for V2X applications such as self-driving cars. It is an alternative to 802.11p, the IEEE specified standard for V2V and other forms of V2X communications.

Cellular V2X uses 3GPP standardised 4G LTE or 5G mobile cellular connectivity to exchange messages between vehicles, pedestrians, and wayside traffic control devices such as traffic signals. It commonly uses the 5.9 GHz frequency band, which is the officially designated intelligent transportation system (ITS) frequency in most countries. C-V2X can function without network assistance and exceeds the range of DSRC by about 25%.

C-V2X was developed within the 3rd Generation Partnership Project (3GPP) to replace DSRC in the US and C-ITS in Europe.

History 
In 2014, 3GPP Release 13 spurred studies to test the applicability of the then current standards to V2X. This resulted in the 3GPP Release 14 specifications for C-V2X communications, finalised in 2017. 3GPP Release 15 introduced 5G for V2N use-cases and 3GPP Release 16 includes work on 5G NR direct communications for V2V/V2I.

In Europe, the EU announced in July 2019 that it was adopting a technology-neutral approach to C-ITS, leaving the way forward for 4G, 5G and other advanced technologies to be part of V2X applications and services.

In the United States, the Federal Communications Commission proposed late in 2019 that 20 MHz and possibly 30 MHz of the 5.9 GHz band be allocated to C-V2X. In November 2020, this proposal was accepted, and the upper 30 MHz (5.895–5.925 GHz) were allocated to C-V2X.

Modes 

C-V2X has the following modes:

 Device-to-network: communication using conventional cellular links for vehicle-to-network (V2N) applications such as cloud services in end-to-end solutions
 Device-to-device: direct communication without the use of network scheduling for vehicle-to-vehicle (V2V), vehicle-to-infrastructure (V2I), and vehicle-to-pedestrian (V2P)  applications such as vulnerable road user protection and tolling

C-V2X mode 4 communication relies on a distributed resource allocation scheme, namely sensing-based semipersistent scheduling which schedules radio resources in a stand-alone fashion in each user equipment (UE).

Problems 
All the communications systems based on wireless communication suffer from the drawbacks, inherent to wireless communication, which are the limited capacities in various areas:

 Limited channels, This limit will affect especially metropolitan areas.
 Limited data rates,
 Wireless communication is susceptible to external influences, which may be hostile.
 In metropolitan areas, limits of data propagation due to surroundings such as buildings, tunnels and also Doppler effects, causing propagation speed reduction by repetitive transmissions required.
 The costs to provide a comprehensive appropriate network such as LTE or 5G are enormous.
 Possible abuse of this technology leading to mass surveillance.

Outlook 
The solution to handle the flow of data is expected to come from artificial intelligence. Doubts in artificial intelligence (AI) and decision making by AI exist.

Tests 
In April 2019 test and verification of communication elements took place on the EuroSpeedway Lausitz. Participants were Ford, Samsung, Vodafone, Huawei, LG Electronics and others. Topics were communication matters, especially interoperability, said to have been successful at 96%.

In September 2019, the Global mobile Suppliers Association reported that it had identified global trials and products including:
 twenty-five operators involved in trials of LTE- or 5G-based C-V2X technologies
 three 3GPP Release 14 compliant C-V2X chipsets
 eight pre-commercial and commercial automotive-grade modules supporting LTE or 5G for C-V2X from seven vendors
 sixteen C-V2X RSUs (Roadside Units) from 13 vendors
 fourteen C-V2X OBUs (Onboard Units) from 12 vendors

Literature

External links

References 

Advanced driver assistance systems
Driving
Emerging technologies
Vehicle technology
Vehicle telematics
Wireless networking